Pala Parish is a former rural municipality in eastern Estonia. It was a part of Jõgeva County. The municipality had a population of 1,363 (as of 1 January 2004) and covered an area of 156.71 km². The population density was 8.7 inhabitants per km². There was a total of 23 villages in Pala Parish.

Administrative centre of the municipality was Pala with population of 276. It was first mentioned in 1582 as Pallawes. There are a school, a musical school, a library and a cultural centre in Pala village. Pala Parish is also described as being in a better overall condition then other parishes around the area.

Settlements
Villages
Assikvere - Äteniidi - Haavakivi - Kadrina - Kirtsi - Kodavere - Kokanurga - Lümati - Metsanurga - Moku - Nõva - Pala - Perametsa - Piibumäe - Piirivarbe - Punikvere - Raatvere - Ranna - Sääritsa - Sassukvere - Sõõru - Tagumaa - Vea

References

External links